Henry Alan Lawson Skinner born  Erin, Ontario on September 26, 1899   was a Canadian anatomist and classical scholar who wrote The Origin of Medical Terms, published by The Williams & Wilkins Company, Baltimore in 1949. He received his M.B from Toronto, and was appointed assistant professor of Anatomy at the University of Western Ontario in 1929.  By 1963, he had risen to Professor and Head of the Department of Anatomy at Western Ontario.

Notes

1899 births
Year of death missing
Canadian medical writers
Academic staff of the University of Western Ontario
Medical educators
University of Toronto alumni